Škoda 26 T (also known as Škoda ForCity Classic) is a five carbody section low-floor bi-directional tram, developed by Škoda Transportation for Miskolc, Hungary. The low-floor area of the fully airconditioned tram represents 100% of the entire vehicle floor. Miskolc transport authority ordered 31 units, the deliveries of which were done between 2013 and 2015. Currently, all 31 units are in service in Miskolc.

Vehicle design
As a heavily modified version of Škoda 14 T, the tram was designed by Aufeer Design, Mladá Boleslav. It consists five sections with three bogies. The doors are located both sides of the vehicle (6+6), the first and the last doors are smaller. The total capacity of the fully air conditioned car is over 300 passengers.

References

External links 

  News on Škoda webpages

Škoda trams